A Joint Task Force is a "joint" (multi-service) ad hoc military formation. The task force concept originated with the United States Navy in the 1920s and 1930s.

"Combined" is the British-American military term for multi-national formations. 
CTF – Commander Task Force, sometimes Combined Task Force
CCTF – Commander Combined Task Force
CJTF – Combined Joint Task Force

There are two ways in which a U.S. or U.S.-allied task force may be assigned a number. The first is the originally naval scheme promulgated and governed by the Military Command, Control, Communications, and Computers Executive Board (MC4EB), chaired by the Joint Staff J6. Task force numbers allocated under this scheme form the majority of the listings below.

The second is a by-product of the U.S. Army's procedure for forming task-organised forces for combat, differing from strictly doctrinally assigned table of organization and equipment organizations. A battalion, company or brigade commander has very wide latitude in selecting a task force name, though often the name of the commander is used (e.g. Task Force Faith; Task Force Smith was named for the commander of the 1st Battalion, 21st Infantry Regiment). This has often resulted in derivations from the originator unit's numerical designation being used. For example, when a special operations aviation unit was being formed in the late 1970s, the original unit drew heavily on personnel from the 158th Aviation. The designation chosen was Task Force 158, which later grew to become the 160th Special Operations Aviation Regiment. Another example comes from 2004 in Afghanistan. On 15 April 2004 the headquarters of the U.S. Army's 25th Infantry Division arrived in Afghanistan and took command of CJTF-180 from the 10th Mountain Division. Lieutenant General David Barno, commanding then decided to rename CJTF 180 because the “180” designation had traditionally been given to Joint task forces led by the Army's XVIII Airborne Corps. Barno chose Combined Joint Task Force 76 as the new name to evoke America's history and the democratic spirit of 1776. The CFC-A commander intended this new designation to highlight the change in command at the operational level at a time when Afghanistan appeared to be moving closer to democracy.
 
No coordination appears to occur between U.S. Army task forces designated in this way, and the USMCEB scheme. This has resulted in simultaneous designations being used at the same time. For example, Combined Joint Task Force 76, was in use in Afghanistan in 2004, but doubling up on the Task Force 76 designation used for decades by Amphibious Force, United States Seventh Fleet, in north Asia.

Joint Task Force Exercise (JTFEX) is designed to test a strike group's ability to operate in hostile and complex environments with other U.S. and coalition forces. The integrated exercise combines specific warfare areas with the purpose of making preparations for the strike group's upcoming deployment. An example of such an exercise includes The John F. Kennedy (CV-67) Carrier Battle Group which participated in Joint Task Force Exercise (JTFEX) 02-1, in the waters off the East Coast as well as on training ranges in North Carolina and Florida during Operation Enduring Freedom January 19, 2002

Numbered USMCEB joint task forces
Allied Communications Publication 113: Call Signs Book for Ships in its Annex B lists allocations of task force numbers from 1 to approximately 1000, allocated by the United States Military Communications-Electronic Board in blocks for use by the United States Department of Defense and allies.

Norman Polmar noted in Ships and Aircraft of the U.S. Fleet, 2005, that the task forces under the commanders of the Atlantic and Pacific Fleet are mainly for contingency purposes.<ref name=NP2005>Norman Polmar, Ships and Aircraft of the U.S. Fleet,' Naval Institute Press, 2005, p.37</ref> They are employed for specific operations and exercises.

Combined Task Force (CTF) 13 conducted a simulated long range raid on Camp Hanson, Okinawa Japan, March 21, 2016. CTF-13 conducted the raid, which commenced in South Korea, to demonstrate air assault, multi-continent long-range raid capabilities and the ability to deliver security and stability. CTF 13 included 1st Battalion, 3rd Marines.

Named joint task forces
Joint Task Force Shining Hope; Joint Task Force Eagle Vista (1998 Presidential African visit)

United States Army and other non-USMCEB task forces

These included Combined Joint Task Force 76, Combined Joint Task Force 82, and Combined Joint Task Force 180.

Others
Task Force for Business and Stability Operations – U.S. Department of Defense commercial facilitation organization, not a military operational task force.
Task Force 6-26 – USSOCOM or JSOC task force
 Task Force 1-37 Armor was a heavy battalion mechanized task force formed around units of the 1st Armored Division (United States). It served at the Battle of Medina Ridge during the 1991 Gulf War.

See also
Taskforce (disambiguation)
The Wire (JTF-GTMO)

References

"The Development of Unified Command Structure for the U. S. Armed Forces, 1945-1950," p. 11-21  in Ronald H. Cole, et al., The History of Unified Command 1946–1993 (Washington, DC: Joint History Office of the Office of the Chairman of the Joint Chiefs of Staff, 1995)

Norman Polmar, Ships and Aircraft of the U.S. Fleet,' Naval Institute Press, see 11th Edition, 1978, pp6–9; 13th Edition, 1984, pp14–17; 14th Edition, 1987, pp15–19; 2005 edition.

Further reading
Timothy M. Bonds, Myron Hura, Thomas-Durrell Young, 'Enhancing Army Joint Force Headquarters Capabilities,' Santa Monica, CA; RAND Corporation, 2010 – includes list of joint task forces
Geoffrey Carter, Crises Do Happen – The Royal Navy and Operation Musketeer, Suez 1956, Liskeard, Maritime Books, 2006.
Center for Naval Analysis, Joint Task Force Operations since 1983 , CRM94-42, July 1994
 Edgar F. Raines, "The Rucksack War: U.S. Army Operational Logistics in Grenada, 1983," Center for Military History, 2010. 120-series task forces active during "Operation Urgent Fury" in Grenada in 1983.
 Includes mention of a number of RN task groups.

Joint task forces (armed forces)